The spinose flower moth (Schinia spinosae) is a moth of the family Noctuidae. It is found in North America, including New York and Maryland.

The wingspan is about 22–24 mm.

It uses Polygonella as a host plant, and seems to use Polygonella articulata across much of its northern range.

References

External links
Images
Moths of Maryland

Schinia
Moths of North America
Moths described in 1852